A pork chop is a cut of pig meat.

Pork chop may also refer to:

 Pork chop bun, one of the most popular and famous snacks in Macau
 Porkchop Cash, an American professional wrestler
 Victoria "Porkchop" Parker, American drag queen
 Pork Chop, a nickname of American football player Floyd Womack
 Pork Chop Gang, a group of north Florida legislators (1930s to 1960s)
 Pork Chop, a sports mascot of the University of Arkansas
 Pork Chop Hill, a 1959 American film
 Porkchop plot, a type of graph used in astrodynamics
 Pork chop, a derogatory term for Portuguese people 
 Porkchop, a character from Doug
 Battle of Pork Chop Hill